Humphrey Colman Boardman (26 July 1904 – 15 June 1998) was an English rower who competed for Great Britain at the 1928 Summer Olympics at Amsterdam. He was born in Norwich. He was the younger brother of Christopher Boardman who won gold in the Sailing at the 1936 Summer Olympics.  Their father, Edward Thomas Boardman, was a  Norwich architect, as was, their grandfather Edward Boardman. Their mother, Florence, was the daughter of Jeremiah Colman (MP) owner of Colman's Mustard.

In the 1928 Summer Olympics he and his partner Denis Guye participated in the double sculls event. They qualified for the second round repêchage but did not start in this race. At the 1930 Empire Games he was a member of the English boat which won the gold medal in the coxed fours competition as well as in the eights contest.

References

External links
 Sports-Reference.com "Rowing at the 1928 Amsterdam Summer Games: Men's Double Sculls Round One Repêchage" Retrieved 2010-09-10.
 Sports-Reference.com "Humphrey Boardman" Retrieved 2010-09-10.

1904 births
1998 deaths
English male rowers
Olympic rowers of Great Britain
Rowers at the 1928 Summer Olympics
Rowers at the 1930 British Empire Games
Commonwealth Games gold medallists for England
Sportspeople from Norwich
Commonwealth Games medallists in rowing
20th-century English people
Medallists at the 1930 British Empire Games